Transport is a three-piece independent rock band from Brisbane, Queensland, made up of Keir Nuttall (guitar, vocals), Scott Saunders (bass, vocals) and Steve Pope (drums).

History
Transport was formed in 2001 when all three members were studying at the Queensland Conservatorium of Music. In 2003 they won Australia's National Campus Band Competition.

Transport also tours and records as the band of Brisbane singer and Sony-BMG artist Kate Miller-Heidke, joined by singer and violinist Sallie Campbell.

Transport's material is written and developed co-operatively by the band, and Keir Nuttall has also contributed songs to Kate Miller-Heidke's repertoire, notably her turntable hit Space They Cannot Touch from 2004's Telegram, and her 2007 single Words.

Transport's first two EPs and other songs including the single Sunday Driver were recorded by producer Guy Cooper (Serotonin Productions) on the Gold Coast.

The band has continued to record and perform independently of Kate Miller-Heidke, mainly at Brisbane venues but also on international and interstate tours, and live radio broadcasts. The band's song Sunday Driver was downloaded a record 24,000 times from the website of youth radio network Triple J, and in Britain Stone Hearted has been aired on BBC Radio 1 and on Kerrang! Radio.

In April 2007 Transport appeared at the Roxy Theatre in Los Angeles as part of the Musexpo music and media conference. In May–June 2007 the band toured independent venues in the UK as part of the CMEAS Spring Tour. In November 2007 Transport's first full-length album Inner Chimp was pre-released for download.

Discography

EPs
Safe No Rebounds (2004)
Transport (2005)

Singles
Stone Hearted (2006)

Albums
Inner Chimp (Completed 2007 (Unreleased))

References
 Emma Chalmers, Winning band makes sparks fly, Brisbane Courier-Mail, 14 November 2003
 Guy Mosel, Transport a pandora's box, Brisbane Courier-Mail, 18 June 2004
 Noel Mengel, Something for Kate among the rock hits, Brisbane Courier-Mail, 10 August 2006

External links
 Transport: official website
 Transport at MySpace
 Transport lyrics at SongMeanings
 Kate Miller-Heidke official website

Musical groups established in 2001
Australian indie rock groups
Australian heavy metal musical groups